Shyam Kumar Shrestha is a Nepalese politician, belonging to the Nepal Communist Party currently serving as the member of the 1st Federal Parliament of Nepal. In the 2017 Nepalese general election he was elected from the Ramechhap 1 constituency, securing 42117(50.66%)  votes.

References

Nepal MPs 2017–2022
Living people
Communist Party of Nepal (Maoist Centre) politicians
Members of the 2nd Nepalese Constituent Assembly
1971 births